The Majorera is an endangered breed of small domestic donkey indigenous to the Canary Islands, the Spanish archipelago in the Atlantic off the coast of southern Morocco. There are approximately 200 of the donkeys; almost all are on the island of Fuerteventura, with a small number on Lanzarote. The name derives from majorero, a demonym for the people of Fuerteventura. The Majorera is a small donkey of African origin, and is the only equine breed of the archipelago.

History

The Majorera was introduced to the Canaries at the time of the Spanish conquest in the fifteenth century. It is now present in all six municipalities of Fuerteventura, Antigua, Betancuria, La Oliva, Pájara, Puerto del Rosario and Tuineje; a small number are on Lanzarote, and a few on the other islands.

From 1997 the Majorera was listed by the Ministerio de Agricultura, Alimentación y Medio Ambiente, the Spanish ministry of agriculture, as "under special protection, in danger of extinction". Its conservation status was listed as "critical" by the FAO in 2007 and as "endangered" by the SAVE Foundation in 2008.

The breed is well adapted to the volcanic semi-desert conditions, the high temperatures, and the low rainfall of Fuerteventura, and was used by the islanders for riding and for all kinds of agricultural work: as a pack animal, as a draught animal, and for animal traction tasks such as ploughing. As with other donkey breeds, the mechanisation of agriculture in the twentieth century led to a rapid fall in numbers. In 2009 the population was reported as 141; at the end of 2013 the total number recorded was 27.

Characteristics

The Majorera is a small donkey of African type. It usually grey, ranging from pale to dark grey, and may also be brown. It has primitive markings: a darker dorsal stripe and shoulder-stripe, and zebra-striping on the legs.

References

Canary Islands
Donkey breeds originating in Spain
Donkey breeds